Epitrichosma crymodes is a species of moth of the family Tortricidae. It is found in Australia, where it has been recorded from New South Wales and Queensland.

The wingspan is about 12 mm. The forewings are whitish, with pale grey strigulae (fine streaks) forming ill-defined markings. The hindwings are whitish.

References

Moths described in 1910
Schoenotenini